Eckerson House is a historic house located at 280 Chestnut Ridge Road in Montvale, Bergen County, New Jersey, United States. The house was built in 1796 and was added to the National Register of Historic Places on January 10, 1983.

See also
National Register of Historic Places listings in Bergen County, New Jersey

References

External links

Houses on the National Register of Historic Places in New Jersey
Houses completed in 1796
Houses in Bergen County, New Jersey
Montvale, New Jersey
National Register of Historic Places in Bergen County, New Jersey
New Jersey Register of Historic Places
Historic American Buildings Survey in New Jersey
1796 establishments in New Jersey